Frik van Rooyen (born 6 November 1936) is a South African boxer. He competed in the men's middleweight event at the 1960 Summer Olympics.

References

1936 births
Living people
South African male boxers
Olympic boxers of South Africa
Boxers at the 1960 Summer Olympics
People from Limpopo
Middleweight boxers